John Primer (born March 5, 1945, Camden, Mississippi, United States) is an American Chicago blues and electric blues singer and guitarist who played behind Junior Wells in the house band at Theresa's Lounge and as a member of the bands of Willie Dixon, Muddy Waters and Magic Slim before launching an award-winning career as a front man, carrying forward the traditional Windy City sound into the 21st century.

Biography

Childhood 
Born into a family of Mississippi sharecroppers, Primer grew up imbued with a strong work ethic from his forebears and in a farming community that was deeply involved in the blues tradition, singing work songs in the field during the week and spirituals in church on Sundays. Living on the Mansell Plantation in rural Madison County, he lived in a shack with no running water and a leaking roof with his large, extended family. He shared a bed with cousins, and lost his father at age 22 after a truck accident when he was four years old.

He fell in love with the blues in infancy when his father and an elder cousin played guitar and sang at night after a hard day in the fields. His mother subsequently moved to Chicago in order to secure a job and support her family. She promised to bring John and his sister to the big city when they reached age 18, leaving them with family. Depressed and lonely, young Primer frequently went into the neighboring woods, where he cried his troubles away and began singing the blues in solitude. He eventually built himself a diddley bow on the side of his grandmother's house out of broom wire, two nails and a brick and began accompanying himself as he sang, eventually playing for dimes and quarters in his schoolyard. After listening Jimmy Reed, Little Milton, B.B. King, Albert King and Muddy Waters on his grandmother's record player, his biggest dream was to play alongside Muddy Waters one day.

Early years in Chicago 
Setting his sights on his dream and with a Harmony guitar in hand, Primer relocated to Chicago in 1963 when he reached 18, just as his mother had promised. He eventually started learning his trade by playing for tips at the legendary Maxwell Street market alongside blues superstars and raw beginners like himself. He eventually landed his first regular gig, joining with Pat Rushing—one of the most iconic performers in the neighborhood—to form The Maintainers and play on Sundays. The band eventually started booking gigs in small bars and clubs on the city's West Side, most prominently The Bow Tie, Lover's Lounge and The Place. In 1968, he left Rushing to join the soul/R&B group, The Brotherhood Band, where he served as front man and began developing the unique singing style he is known for today.

Sideman with the greats 
In 1974, he started playing seven nights a week as a member of the house band at Theresa's, the South Side club, learning how to play slide guitar from bandmate and former Muddy sideman Sammy Lawhorn and backing harmonica player Junior Wells, who regularly fronted the unit when off the road, as well as Magic Sam, James Cotton, Magic Slim and others. After seeing him in action at Theresa's, Willie Dixon invited Primer to join his Chicago Blues All-Stars in 1979, touring with him internationally for a year, during which he honed his skills as a slide guitarist, vocalist and songwriter.

Primer's childhood dream came true in 1980, when Muddy Waters formed a new band after the departure of his old unit, which rebranded themselves as the Legendary Blues Band. In addition to serving as Waters' guitarist, he immediately assumed responsibilities as Muddy's bandleader and opening act. Primer held the position until Waters' passing in 1983, during which he received additional training on the six-string and Muddy instilled in him the importance of maintaining the old-school blues tradition. His lengthy recording career as a sideman began as a member of the Waters band in 1980 with Blues Deluxe, a compilation recorded live by radio station WXRT-FM at Navy Pier. He recorded with Muddy and the Rolling Stones at Buddy Guy's Checkerboard Lounge in 1981, a concert that was eventually released as an award-winning DVD. He began sitting in at jams at the Checkerboard in that era, eventually spent two decades as the band leader for Monday night jams, where he began passing on his skills to a younger group of musicians. He maintained the position until 2001, when the original nightclub closed its doors for the final time.

Following Waters' death, Primer also joined Magic Slim's band, The Teardrops, eventually becoming its band leader and teaming on rhythm guitar with Slim's bassist brother, Nick Holt, to create what became as known as the "lump de lump" cadence pattern that became dominant in the Chicago blues sound. During the 13 years Primer spent at Slim's side, the band won contemporary album of the year honors in the Blues Music Awards on three occasions and received two nominations as band of the year.

Solo career 
Primer made his recording debut as front man with Poor Man's Blues for Wolf Records, the Austria-based label that was also Magic Slim's longtime home. Stuff You Got to Watch on Earwig Records followed in 1991 with a lineup that included Holt on bass and Mervyn "Harmonica" Hinds on harmonica and The Real Deal on Code Blue/Atlantic four years later with backing from harp player Billy Branch, bassist Johnny B. Gayden and keyboard player David Maxwell, among others. The CD earned him a 1997 W.C. Handy Award nomination for traditional album of the year. He has subsequently enjoyed an enduring relationship with Wolf Records as well as his own Blues House Productions imprint, which was founded in 2008. One of the most honored blues artists of his generation, he is a 2017 inductee into the Chicago Blues Hall of Fame, a lifetime achievement award nominee from the Mississippi Valley Blues Society and the Pennsylvania Blues Society. His musicianship and recordings have earned two Grammy Award nominations and dozens of awards and nominations from Blues Music Awards, Blues Blast Music Awards and Living Blues magazine.

Discography

Albums

Guest/sideman

Awards and honors
 1987—W.C. Handy Award honoree for best traditional blues album of the year for Magic Slim & the Teardrops' Chicago Blues Sessions Vol. 3
1990—W.C. Handy Award winner for band of the year as a member of Magic Slim & the Teardrops
1991—W.C. Handy Award winner for band of the year as a member of Magic Slim & the Teardrops
1997—W.C. Handy Award nominee for traditional blues album of the year -- The Real Deal
1997—Awarded the Theresa Needham Blues Award by the Theresa Needham Blues Center for outstanding service to the blues community
 2009—Grammy nominee for best traditional blues album -- Chicago Blues a Living History
2009—Blues Blast Music Awards nominee in best traditional blues album category -- Chicago Blues a Living History
2009—Blues Blast Music Awards nominee in best traditional blues album category -- All Original
2009—Blewzzy Award for best blues CD of the year -- All Original
 2009—Blues Blast Music Awards nominee for male artist of the year
2010—Honored as male blues artist of the year by Living Blues magazine
2010—Blues Music Awards nominee for traditional male blues artist of the year
2010—Guitarist on Pinetop Perkins and Willie "Big Eyes" Smith's best traditional blues Grammy-winning Joined at the Hip album
 2010—Blues Music Awards nominee for traditional blues album of the year -- All Original
 2012—Blues Blast Music Awards nominee for traditional blues album of the year -- Chicago Blues a Living History: The (R)evolution Continues
2012—Blues Music Awards nominee for traditional male blues artist of the year
 2012—Blues Music Awards honoree for traditional blues album of the year -- Chicago Blues a Living History: The (R)evolution Continues
 2012—Blues Music Awards nominee for blues album of the year -- Chicago Blues a Living History: The (R)evolution Continues
2013—Blues Music Awards nominee for traditional male blues artist of the year
2013—Blues Music Awards nominee for acoustic blues album of the year -- Blues on Solid Ground
 2013—Lifetime achievement award honoree from the Mississippi Valley Blues Society
2013—Lifetime achievement award honoree from the Pennsylvania Blues Society
2013—Blues Music Awards DVD of the year honoree, Live at the Checkerboard Lounge, included John in action with Muddy Waters and the Rolling Stones
2014—Blues Blast Music Awards nominee for traditional blues album of the year -- Knockin' Around These Blues with Bob Corritore
2014—Blues Music Awards nominee for traditional male blues artist of the year
 2015—Blues Music Awards nominee for traditional male blues artist of the year
 2015—Grammy nominee for best blues album -- Muddy Waters 100
 2016—Blues Music Awards honoree as traditional male blues artist of the year
 2014—Blues Blast Music Awards nominee for traditional blues album of the year -- Ain't Nothing You Can Do with Bob Corritore
2017—Blues Music Awards nominee for traditional male blues artist of the year
2017—Inducted as a legendary blues artist into the Chicago Blues Hall of Fame
 2018—Blues Music Awards nominee for traditional male blues artist of the year
 2019—Blues Blast Music Awards honoree as male blues artist of the year
2019—Blues Blast Music Awards honoree for soul blues album of the year -- The Soul of a Blues Man
2019—Living Blues Awards nominee for most outstanding musician (guitar)
2020—Blues Blast Music Awards nominee for traditional blues album of the year -- The Gypsy Woman Told Me with Bob Corritore
2020—Blues Music Awards nominee for traditional male blues artist of the year
2020—Living Blues Awards nominee for blues artist of the year
2021—Living Blues Awards honoree as traditional male blues artist of the year
2023—Inducted into the Blues Hall of Fame

Filmography
 2005 -- Live at B.L.U.E.S  (Chicago)
2012 -- Live at the Checkerboard Lounge: Live Chicago 1981  (with Muddy Waters & the Rolling Stones)

References

External links
 Official site
John Primer Interview NAMM Oral History Program (2014)

1945 births
Living people
American blues guitarists
American male guitarists
American blues singers
Songwriters from Mississippi
Blues musicians from Mississippi
Chicago blues musicians
Slide guitarists
Songwriters from Illinois
Guitarists from Illinois
Guitarists from Mississippi
20th-century American guitarists
20th-century American male musicians
Earwig Music artists
American male songwriters